The 150th Indian Infantry Brigade was an Infantry formation of the Indian Army during World War II. The brigade was formed in March 1944, at Secunderabad as a Jungle Training Brigade assigned to the Southern Army.

In September 1945 the brigade was part of XXXIV Corps (India), en route to Hong Kong.

Formation
2nd Battalion, Assam Regiment  March 1944 to July 1945
9th Battalion, 8th Punjab Regiment May 1944 to July 1944
1st Battalion, East Yorkshire Regiment July 1944 to March 1945
6th Battalion, 7th Rajput Regiment August to December 1944
8th Battalion, 8th Punjab Regiment September 1944 to June 1945
7th Battalion, King's Own Royal Regiment (Lancaster) October 1944 to February 1945
2nd Battalion, King's Own Yorkshire Light Infantry April to August 1945
8th Battalion, 14th Punjab Regiment July to August 1945
9th Battalion, York and Lancaster Regiment July to August 1945

See also

 List of Indian Army Brigades in World War II

References

British Indian Army brigades